Sayan railway station is a railway station on the Western Railway network in the state of Gujarat, India. Sayan railway station is 13 km far away from Surat railway station. Passenger, MEMU and few Express trains halt at Sayan railway station.

Nearby Stations 

Gothangam is the nearest railway station towards Mumbai, whereas Kudsad is the nearest railway station towards Vadodara.

Major Trains 

Passenger Trains:

 59049/50 Valsad - Viramgam Passenger
 69149/50 Virar - Bharuch MEMU
 59439/40 Mumbai Central - Ahmedabad Passenger
 59441/42 Ahmedabad - Mumbai Central Passenger
 69111/12 Surat - Vadodara MEMU
 69171/72 Surat - Bharuch MEMU
 69109/10 Vadodara - Surat MEMU

Following Express trains halt at Sayan railway station in both directions:

 19033/34 Valsad - Ahmedabad Gujarat Queen Express
 19215/16 Mumbai Central - Porbandar Saurashtra Express

References

See also
 Surat district

Railway stations in Surat district
Vadodara railway division
Transport in Surat